Bailie is an English surname. Notable people with this name include:

 Jim Bailie (n.d.), Irish politician
 Kim Bailie (1929—2008), Aeronautics engineer
 Ryan Bailie (b. 1990), Australian triathlete
 Tony Bailie (b. 1964), Irish author
 Robin Bailie (b. 1937), Irish politician and solicitor
 Kevin Bailie (b. 1992) Canadian hockey player and lawyer
 Colin Bailie (b. 1964), Irish football player
 James Bailie (1890—1967), Irish unionist politician
 David Bailie (1937—2021), South African actor
 Sandra Bailie (b. 1960), Irish lawn bowler
 Thomas Bailie (1885—1957), Irish politician
 William Bailie (died c. 1948), founded Bailieborough
 Sally A. Bailie (1937—1995), English racehorse trainer and owner
 Helen Tufts Bailie (1874—1962), American social activist
 William Bailie (bishop) (died 1664), Anglican clergyman 
 Adrian Bailie Nottage Palmer, 4th Baron Palmer (b. 1951), Scottish aristocrat

See also 

 Bailie (name)
 Baillie (surname)

English-language surnames